James Woodburn (29 January 1917 – 2 January 1978) was a Scottish footballer who played as a wing half.

Woodburn played in The Football League for Newcastle United and Gateshead between 1938 and 1952 (with short guest periods at several Scottish and English clubs during World War II), before a spell at North Eastern League side Consett.

Woodburn died in Leeds on 2 January 1978, at the age of 60.

References

Sources

1917 births
1978 deaths
Sportspeople from Rutherglen
Scottish footballers
Association football wing halves
Newcastle United F.C. players
Gateshead F.C. players
Consett A.F.C. players
English Football League players
Doncaster Rovers F.C. wartime guest players
Third Lanark A.C. wartime guest players
Liverpool F.C. wartime guest players
Aberdeen F.C. wartime guest players
Hibernian F.C. wartime guest players
Dundee United F.C. wartime guest players
Footballers from South Lanarkshire